Landowski or Landowsky (feminine Landowska, plural Landowscy) is a Polish surname. 

Notable people with the surname include:
 Françoise Landowski-Caillet (1917–2007), French pianist and painter, son of Paul
 Jan Landowski, Polish Warsaw Zoo director 
 John Landowski, American track and field athlete and football player
 Karol Landowski (born 2000), Polish footballer 
 Marcel Landowski (1915–1999), French composer, son of Paul
 Manon Landowski (born 1964), French singer-songwriter, daughter of Marcel, granddaughter of Paul
  (1908–1943), French painter, son of Paul
 Paul Landowski (1875–1961), Polish-French monument sculptor, Christ the Redeemer (statue) creator
 Ralph Landowski (1912–1968), American politician and plumber
 Trina Landowski, Wisconsin Miss Teen USA 1992
 Klaus-Rüdiger Landowsky, German politician and manager, former member of city parliament in Berlin (West)
 Wanda Landowska (1879–1959), Polish harpsichordist

Fictional
 Private Landowska, character from Screamers (1995 film)
 Stanley Landowski, one of a draft names of character Stanley Kowalski from A Streetcar Named Desire

Polish-language surnames